Silveiro Garcia (born 2 April 1994) is an East Timorese football player who currently plays as a forward for AS Ponta Leste in Liga Futebol Amadora and he also play for Timor-Leste national football team.

International career
Garcia made his senior international debut in a 1–2 loss against Chinese Taipei in a 2019 AFC Asian Cup qualification on 11 October 2016.

International goals
Scores and results list East Timor's goal tally first.

Honours
AS Ponta Leste
Taça 12 de Novembro Champions : 2016
LFA Super Taça Champions : 2016

References

1994 births
Living people
East Timorese footballers
Timor-Leste international footballers
People from Manatuto District
Association football forwards
Footballers at the 2018 Asian Games
Asian Games competitors for East Timor